Enteromius stauchi is a species of ray-finned fish in the genus Enteromius. It may be a synonym of Enteromius rubrostigma and is endemic to the Republic of the Congo.

Footnotes 

 

Endemic fauna of the Republic of the Congo
Enteromius
Taxa named by Jacques Daget
Fish described in 1967